Kopřivná is a municipality and village in Šumperk District in the Olomouc Region of the Czech Republic. It has about 300 inhabitants.

Administrative parts
The hamlet of Lužná is an administrative part of Kopřivná.

Etymology
The original German name Geppersdorf (i.e. "Gepper's village") was derived from the personal name of the lokator of the village. The Czech name was created in 1846, when the German letter "g" was replaced by similarly sounding Czech "kopř-", thus the new name was Kopřinov. The word "Kopřivnov" reminded Czech word kopřiva (i.e. "nettle"), so the name was changed to Kopřivná in 1924.

Geography
It lies in the Hanušovice Highlands. The eponymous creek Kopřivná springs here and flows across the municipality.

History
The first written mention of Kopřivná is from 1414, where it is mentioned as a part of the Bludov estate.

The population was ethnically German until the World War II. After the war, Germans were expelled and the village was partially resettled by Czechs.

Demographics

Sights

The landmark of Kopřivná is the Church of the Holy Trinity. The original church was first mentioned in 1594, but due to its poor condition, it was replaced by the current one in 1747.

Nový Hrad is a castle ruin in the woods in the western part of the territory. The castle was first mentioned in 1374, and it was referred to as abandoned in 1504. Remains of walls with prismatic bastions, moats, a cylindrical tower and fragments of a residential palace have been preserved from the original castle.

References

External links

Villages in Šumperk District